In six-dimensional geometry, a runcinated 6-simplex is a convex uniform 6-polytope constructed as a runcination (3rd order truncations) of the regular 6-simplex.

There are 8 unique runcinations of the 6-simplex with permutations of truncations, and cantellations.

Runcinated 6-simplex

Alternate names 
 Small prismated heptapeton (Acronym: spil) (Jonathan Bowers)

Coordinates 
The vertices of the runcinated 6-simplex can be most simply positioned in 7-space as permutations of (0,0,0,1,1,1,2). This construction is based on facets of the runcinated 7-orthoplex.

Images

Biruncinated 6-simplex

Alternate names 
 Small biprismated tetradecapeton (Acronym: sibpof) (Jonathan Bowers)

Coordinates 
The vertices of the biruncinted 6-simplex can be most simply positioned in 7-space as permutations of (0,0,1,1,1,2,2). This construction is based on facets of the biruncinated 7-orthoplex.

Images

Runcitruncated 6-simplex

Alternate names 
 Prismatotruncated heptapeton (Acronym: patal) (Jonathan Bowers)

Coordinates 
The vertices of the runcitruncated 6-simplex can be most simply positioned in 7-space as permutations of (0,0,0,1,1,2,3). This construction is based on facets of the runcitruncated 7-orthoplex.

Images

Biruncitruncated 6-simplex

Alternate names 
 Biprismatorhombated heptapeton (Acronym: bapril) (Jonathan Bowers)

Coordinates 
The vertices of the biruncitruncated 6-simplex can be most simply positioned in 7-space as permutations of (0,0,1,1,2,3,3). This construction is based on facets of the biruncitruncated 7-orthoplex.

Images

Runcicantellated 6-simplex

Alternate names 
 Prismatorhombated heptapeton (Acronym: pril) (Jonathan Bowers)

Coordinates 
The vertices of the runcicantellated 6-simplex can be most simply positioned in 7-space as permutations of (0,0,0,1,2,2,3). This construction is based on facets of the runcicantellated 7-orthoplex.

Images

Runcicantitruncated 6-simplex

Alternate names 
 Runcicantitruncated heptapeton
 Great prismated heptapeton (Acronym: gapil) (Jonathan Bowers)

Coordinates 
The vertices of the runcicantitruncated 6-simplex can be most simply positioned in 7-space as permutations of (0,0,0,1,2,3,4). This construction is based on facets of the runcicantitruncated 7-orthoplex.

Images

Biruncicantitruncated 6-simplex

Alternate names 
 Biruncicantitruncated heptapeton
 Great biprismated tetradecapeton (Acronym: gibpof) (Jonathan Bowers)

Coordinates 
The vertices of the biruncicantittruncated 6-simplex can be most simply positioned in 7-space as permutations of (0,0,1,2,3,4,4). This construction is based on facets of the biruncicantitruncated 7-orthoplex.

Images

Related uniform 6-polytopes 
The truncated 6-simplex is one of 35 uniform 6-polytopes based on the [3,3,3,3,3] Coxeter group, all shown here in A6 Coxeter plane orthographic projections.

Notes

References
 H.S.M. Coxeter: 
 H.S.M. Coxeter, Regular Polytopes, 3rd Edition, Dover New York, 1973 
 Kaleidoscopes: Selected Writings of H.S.M. Coxeter, edited by F. Arthur Sherk, Peter McMullen, Anthony C. Thompson, Asia Ivic Weiss, Wiley-Interscience Publication, 1995,  
 (Paper 22) H.S.M. Coxeter, Regular and Semi Regular Polytopes I, [Math. Zeit. 46 (1940) 380-407, MR 2,10]
 (Paper 23) H.S.M. Coxeter, Regular and Semi-Regular Polytopes II, [Math. Zeit. 188 (1985) 559-591]
 (Paper 24) H.S.M. Coxeter, Regular and Semi-Regular Polytopes III, [Math. Zeit. 200 (1988) 3-45]
 Norman Johnson Uniform Polytopes, Manuscript (1991)
 N.W. Johnson: The Theory of Uniform Polytopes and Honeycombs, Ph.D. 
  x3o3o3x3o3o - spil, o3x3o3o3x3o - sibpof, x3x3o3x3o3o - patal, o3x3x3o3x3o - bapril, x3o3x3x3o3o - pril, x3x3x3x3o3o - gapil, o3x3x3x3x3o - gibpof

External links 
 Polytopes of Various Dimensions
 Multi-dimensional Glossary

6-polytopes